Tre straniere a Roma, also known as Three Strangers in Rome, is a 1958 Italian romantic comedy film directed by Claudio Gora starring Claudia Cardinale. The film was one of the first movies with Cardinale in a leading role.

Cast
Yvonne Monlaur: Nanda
Claudia Cardinale: Marisa
Françoise Danell: Elsa
Luciano Marin: Sandro Nencioni
Roy Ciccolini: Sergio
Leonardo Botta: Franco
Tamara Lees: Sandro's girlfriend
Renato Chiantoni: Pasquale
Nando Bruno: Vincenzo's father
Guglielmo Inglese: Michele 
Alberto Talegalli: Uncle Gaetano
Gina Mascetti: Owner of the Pensione Aurora
Dolores Palumbo: Sergio's mother
Andrea Scotti: Osvaldo 
Marino Barreto Junior: Himself
Marco Tulli

External links 
 

1958 films
1958 romantic comedy films
Italian black-and-white films
1950s Italian-language films
Films set in Rome
Films directed by Claudio Gora
Italian romantic comedy films
1950s Italian films